Egletes viscosa, the erect tropical daisy, is a New World species of flowering plant in the family Asteraceae. It is widespread across much of South America, Central America, Mexico, and the West Indies, just barely crossing the US border into the southernmost county in Texas (Cameron County).

Egletes viscosa is an annual, aromatic herb up to 60 cm (2 feet) tall, covered with glandular and non-glandular hairs. One plant can produce several flower heads, each with white or pale blue ray florets and yellow disc florets.

References

Astereae
Flora of North America
Flora of South America
Plants described in 1832